Perils of the Jungle is a 1915 American drama film directed by E. A. Martin and starring Harry Carey.

Cast
 Harry Carey

See also
 Harry Carey filmography

External links

1915 films
1915 drama films
1915 short films
Silent American drama films
American silent short films
American black-and-white films
1910s American films